Šumarice is a village situated in Serbia's Kraljevo municipality.

This Šumarice should not be confused with the suburb of Kragujevac (also Šumarice), which is the site of the October in Kragujevac Memorial Park, which commemorates the Kragujevac massacre.

References

Populated places in Raška District